Lions is a family name.  Notable people with the family name include:
Jacques-Louis Lions (1928–2001), French mathematician
John Lions (1937–1998), Australian computer scientist
Pierre-Louis Lions (born 1956), French mathematician

See also
 Lion (name)
 Lyons (surname)

Surnames from nicknames